GP Adria Mobil is an annual single-day road cycling race in Slovenia. Since 2015, the race is organized as a 1.2 event on the UCI Europe Tour.

Winners

References

Cycle races in Slovenia
2015 establishments in Slovenia
Recurring sporting events established in 2015
UCI Europe Tour races